Jowkan-e Pain (also Romanized as Jowkān-e Pā’īn, Jovakān-e Pā’īn, and Jowakān-e Pā’īn; also known as Jovakān and Jowkān) is a village in Bagh Safa Rural District, Sarchehan District, Bavanat County, Fars Province, Iran. At the 2006 census, its population was 228, in 56 families.

References 

Populated places in Sarchehan County